"We Shall Dance" is a song by Greek singer Demis Roussos. It was released as a single in 1971. The song was included on Roussos' 1971 album On the Greek Side of My Mind (originally titled Fire and Ice).

Background and writing 
The song is credited to Harry Chalkitis and Artemios Venturis Roussos (Demis Roussos). The recording was produced by Demis Roussos and Jean-Claude Desmarty.

There is also a Spanish-language version, titled "Bailaremos".

Commercial performance 
The song reached no. 4 in the Netherlands and no. 9 Belgium (Flanders).

Track listings 
7" single Philips 6118 006 (1971, Germany, France, Italy, Portugal)
7" single Philips 60 09 159 (1973, Spain)
 A. "We Shall Dance" (3:32)
 B. "Lord of the Flies" (4:27)

7" single BR 56033 (1973, Netherlands)
 A. "We Shall Dance" (4:27)
 B. "My Reason" (4:55)

Charts 

 Charted posthumously in 2015

References 

1971 songs
1971 singles
Demis Roussos songs
Philips Records singles
Song recordings produced by Demis Roussos